"Stand Up and Run" is a song by Canadian band Billy Talent. It was released in February 2013 as the third single from the band's fourth studio album, Dead Silence. The song's music video was released on February 6, 2013 on YouTube. The song was very successful, peaking at #90 on the Canadian Hot 100 and holding the #1 position on the Billboard Canadian Rock Chart for six weeks straight.

Charts

References

2013 singles
Billy Talent songs
Songs written by Ian D'Sa
Songs written by Benjamin Kowalewicz
Songs written by Jonathan Gallant
Songs written by Aaron Solowoniuk
2012 songs
Roadrunner Records singles

ru : Stand Up and Run